Jean Orry  (4 September 1652 – 29 September 1719) was a French economist.

Life

Early career
Jean Orry was born in Paris on 4 September 1652 to Charles Orry, a merchant, and Madelaine le Cosquyno.

Orry studied law and entered Royal service as a lawyer, becoming a munitioneer for the army of Italy between 1690 and 1698, where he was able to demonstrate his skill at planning and organisation. In 1701, at the start of the Spanish War of Succession, Orry purchased his nobility and became an adviser to Louis XIV of France.

Work in Spain

Orry was sent to Spain by King Louis in 1701. There, Orry joined the self-styled Princesse des Ursins as the de facto rulers of Spain. Towards the end of his term there, by a royal decree composed by Orry on 23 December 1713, traditional local governments (the Cortes) were  centralized by the creation of twenty-one provinces. These Consejos Territoriales were superseded by an intendant directly responsible to Orry. Some of the local councils, such as the Council of Castile retained influence through less direct channels.

Dismissal from Spain
Orry was dismissed through pressures brought to bear by the Parmesan contingent round the new queen, Elisabetta Farnese, and Giulio Alberoni. Orry was ordered from Spain on 7 February 1715. The King signed the Decreto de Nueva Planta later that year, revoking most of the historical rights and privileges of the different kingdoms that conformed the Spanish Crown, unifying them under the laws of Castile, where the Cortes regained some of its power.

Legacy
Giulio Alberoni, the cardinal who succeeded him in power, continued the main lines of his financial reorganization and his repression of the power of the royal councils in favour of a bureaucracy wholly dependent upon the central power. Orry's creation of secretaries of state and intendants continued as a significant element in Spanish governmental administration.

See also
Bourbon Reforms

References

Further reading
Anne Dubet, 2006. Jean Orry et la réforme du gouvernement de l'Espagne (1701-1706) (Clermont-Ferrand)

Bibliography

1652 births
1719 deaths
French economists
17th-century French people
18th-century French people
18th century in Spain